(December 20, 1903 in Nishinomiya – March 12, 1976) was a Japanese baseball manager with the Chunichi Dragons. He is a member of the Japanese Baseball Hall of Fame.

Notes and references

External links

1903 births
1976 deaths
Japanese baseball players
Managers of baseball teams in Japan
Chunichi Dragons managers
People from Nishinomiya
Japanese Baseball Hall of Fame inductees